The 2019–20 Croatian Women's First Football League (Prva hrvatska nogometna liga za žene) is twenty ninth season of Croatian Women's First Football League, the national championship for women's association football teams in Croatia, since its establishment in 1992. The season started on 22 September 2019.

The league was contested by eight teams, two less than in the previous season. It used competition format last used in 2011–12 season with championship and relegation play-offs. First stage was played in a double round robin format, with each team playing every other team two times over 14 rounds. In a second stage teams were divided in two groups according to the table standings. ŽNK Split were the defending champions, having won their first title in 2018–19.

The league was suspended due to the COVID-19 pandemic in March 2020 and resumed behind closed doors on 13 June 2020.

Teams

The following is a complete list of teams who have secured a place in the 2019–20 Croatian Women's First Football League.

Regular season

League table

Results

Play-offs

Championship play-offs

League table

Results

Relegation play-offs

League table

Results

Relegation play-off
At the end of season, seventh placed Viktorija qualified for a home and away relegation playoff tie against a team from second level. However, sixth placed Katarina Zrinski failed to get a licence for top-level football and were demoted to second level. Viktorija automatically avoided relegation and qualified for 2020–21 Croatian Women's First Football League. 2019–20 Croatian Women's Second Football League was suspended in March due to COVID-19 and was not resumed after. Top two teams at the time of suspension, Donat and Marjan qualified for the 2020–21 Croatian Women's First Football League.

Top scorers
Updated to matches played on 9 August 2020.

References

External links
Croatian Women's First Football League at UEFA.com
Croatian Women's First Football League at Croatian Football Federation website

Croatian Women's First Football League seasons
Croatia
women
Football
Football